The 1919–20 season was the Philadelphia Sphas' third season in the American League of Philadelphia and second season as the Sphas (originally called Philadelphia YMHA). Game-by-game records are not available for this season. This was the first season that the Sphas finished with a total record over .500.

References

Philadelphia Sphas seasons